VoF, VOF or V.O.F. may refer to:

 Föreningen Vetenskap och Folkbildning, a Swedish skeptical organisation
 Volume of fluid method, a numerical technique for tracking and locating the fluid interface
 vertical occipital fasciculus, a part of the brain
 Vennootschap onder firma (V.O.F.), a type of general partnership in the Netherlands and Belgium